Cirigliano is a town and comune in the province of Matera, in the Southern Italian region of Basilicata.

Cirigliano is an ancient town whose origin is uncertain. It is surrounded by walls and towers. Cirigliano is a typical medieval village which still has a castle tower with an oval base and a chapel within its walls. It has a 17th-century “Pieta” in a decorated wood temple.

Notes and references

External links
  
  Cirigliano community

Cities and towns in Basilicata